Pictichromis diadema, the bicolor dottyback, diadem dottyback, or purple-top dottyback is a fish species of the dottyback family. It is a popular aquarium fish species.

Distribution
This species is found in rich coral reefs in the western central Pacific Ocean, eastern Malay Peninsula, and western Philippine waters. They are native in 4 countries, including Indonesia, Malaysia, Philippines, and Thailand.

Appearance and anatomy
This species is usually yellow in colour with a magenta stripe running along its back. In the wild, they grow to a reported .

Ecology
Their diet in the wild is only known to consist of crustaceans.

These fish are capable of changing their sex. After eggs are laid, the male aerates them by picking them up in his mouth. In the wild, they defend a territory several yards in diameter.

In the aquarium
Pictichromis diadema is the first dottyback to be kept in captivity. They are widely sold for the aquarium trade. A very skittish addition to any aquarium, one should be wary to keep this species with other fish of similar sizes; if the Pictichromis diadema is the bigger, he will attack them, whereas if he is the smaller, he will hide most of the time.

References

 Gill, A. C. 2004 (3 June) Revision of the Indo-Pacific dottyback fish subfamily Pseudochrominae (Perciformes: Pseudochromidae). Smithiana Monographs No. 1: 1–213, Pls. 1–12.

External links
 

diadema
Fish described in 1978